Terry is a unisex given name, derived from French Thierry and Theodoric. It can also be used as a diminutive nickname for the names Teresa or Theresa (feminine) or Terence or Terrier (masculine).

People

Male
 Terry Albritton (1955–2005), American shot putter, world record holder in 1976
 Terry Antonis (born 1993), Australian association football player
 Terry A. Davis, (1969–2018), American programmer
 Terry Baddoo, CNN journalist
 Terry Balsamo (born 1972), American lead guitarist for the rock band Evanescence
 Terry Beckner (born 1997), American football player
 Terry Bollea (born 1953), professional wrestler, better known by his ring name Hulk Hogan
 Terry Bowden (born 1956), American football coach and former player
 Terry Bradshaw (born 1948), American former National Football League quarterback
 Terry Branstad (born 1946), American politician
 Terry Brooks (born 1944), American fantasy writer
 Terry Brooks (basketball) (born c. 1968), American college basketball player
 Terry Brunk (born 1964), professional wrestler known as "Sabu"
 Terry Byrne (born 1966), English football manager and businessman
 Terry Caldwell (born 1938), English footballer
 Terry Callier (1945–2012), American jazz and folk singer and guitarist
 Terry Carpenter (1900–1978), American politician
 Terry Cochrane (born 1953), Northern Irish footballer
 Terry Cochrane (Canadian football) (born 1963), Canadian football player
 Terry Coldwell, member of the pop group East 17
 Terry Cooper (footballer, born 1944), English footballer
 Terry Connor (born 1962), English football assistant manager and former coach and player
 Terry Cress, Winner of Canada's Worst Handyman 2
 Terry Crews (born 1968), American actor and retired football player
 Terry Daniel, American college football punter (1992–1994)
 Terry Deitz (born 1959) American Survivor contestant and television host
 Terry Dubrow (born 1958), American plastic surgeon and television personality
 Terry Eagleton (born 1943), British literary critic and academic 
 Terry Etim (born 1986), English professional mixed martial artist currently signed to the UFC
 Terry Fair (basketball) (1960–2020), American-Israeli professional basketball player
 Terry Farnsworth (born 1942), Canadian Olympic judoka
 Terry Fator (born 1965), American singing ventriloquist
 Terry Fontenot (born 1980), American football executive
 Terry Fox (1958–1981), Canadian athlete and activist
 Terry Francona (born 1959), American professional baseball manager and former player
 Terry Funk (born 1944), American professional wrestler
 Terry Gilliam (born 1940), British-American film director, and Monty Python member
 Terry Godwin (born 1996), American football player
 Terry Goodkind (1948–2020), American fantasy author
 Terry Haskins (1955–2000), American politician
 Terry Jones (1942–2020), Welsh actor, writer, comedian, screenwriter, film director and Monty Python member
 Terry Kath (1946–1978), American guitarist, singer and founding member of the band Chicago
 Terry Kay (1938–2020), American writer
 Terry Kelly (singer), Canadian singer-songwriter, speaker, and entertainer
 Terry Kilgore (born 1961), American politician
 Terry Kunz (born 1952), American football player
 Terry Labonte (born 1956), American retired NASCAR driver
 Terry Lin (born 1966), Taiwanese singer
 Terry Malone, American football coach
 Terry Manning, American music producer and engineer
 Terry McAuliffe (born 1957), American politician; former Governor of Virginia and former chairman of the Democratic National Committee
 Terry McDermott (born 1951), English footballer
 Terry McEniff, Irish hotelier and politician
 Terry McGroom (1966–2016), American boxer
 Terry McLaurin (born 1996), American football player
 Terry Metcalf (born 1951), American football player
 Terry Moore (disambiguation), multiple people
 Terry Moran (born 1959), American journalist, former co-anchor of the news show Nightline
 Terry Moran (public servant) (born 1947), Australian senior public servant
 Terry Nation, Welsh screenwriter and novelist, creator of the Daleks and Davros for Doctor Who
 Terry Nichols, US convicted accomplice in the Oklahoma City bombing
 Terry O'Quinn (born 1952), American actor best known for playing John Locke on the TV series Lost
 Terry Pilkadaris (born 1973), Australian golfer
 Terry Pratchett (1948–2015), English fantasy author known for the Discworld book series
 Terry Richardson (born 1965), American fashion photographer
 Terry Richardson (ice hockey) (born 1953), Canadian ice hockey player
 Terry Richardson (rugby league), English rugby league footballer in the 1970s and 1980s
 Terry Rozier (born 1994), American basketball player
 Terry Sanford (1917–1998), American politician and educator, Governor of North Carolina (1961–1965)
 Terry Saul (1921–1976), Choctaw/Chickasaw illustrator, painter, muralist, commercial artist, and educator.
 Terry Schofield (born 1948), American basketball player and coach
 Terry Stotts (born 1957), American basketball coach
 Terry Sweeney (born 1950), American actor, writer and comedian on Saturday Night Live
 Terry Sue-Patt (1964–2015), British actor
 Terry Teachout (1956–2022),  American author, critic, biographer, playwright, stage director, and librettist.
 Terry-Thomas (1911–1990), English character actor and comedian 
 Terry Virgo (born 1940), a leader in the British New Church Movement
 Terry Waite (born 1938), British hostage negotiator 
 Terry Wogan (1938–2016), Irish-British broadcaster and television personality
 Terry Yorath (born 1950), Welsh former football manager and player
 Terry Zwigoff (born 1949), American documentary and feature film director

Female
 Terry Alderete (1945–2013), American businesswoman
 Terry Babcock-Lumish (born 1976), American professor
 Terry Baum (born 1946), American playwright
 Terry Bellamy, American former mayor
 Terry Bergeson (born 1942), American educator
 Terry Berkowitz, American video artist
 Terry Berlier (born 1972), American artist and sculptor
 Terry Beyer (born 1951), American politician
 Terry Braunstein (artist) (born 1942), American photomontage artist
 Terry Castle (born 1953), American scholar
 Terry Cole-Whittaker (born 1939), American writer
 Terry Acebo Davis (born 1953), Filipino-American artist and nurse
 Terry Dexter (born 1978), American singer-songwriter
 Terry Van Duyn (born 1951), Democratic politician
 Terry Ehret (born 1955), American poet
 Terry Ellis (born 1963), American singer
 Terry Farrell (actress) (born 1963), American actress
 Terry Finn (born 1955), American actress
 Terry Fulmer, American gerontologist
 Terry Gabreski (born 1952), American vice commander
 Terry Van Ginderen (1931–2018), Flemish television presenter
 Terry Hu (born 1953), Taiwanese actress, writer and translator
 Terry Huntingdon (born 1940), American film actress
 Terry Irwin (designer), American designer
 Terry D. Johnston (born 1947), American politician and businesswoman
 Terry Karl (born 1947), American professor
 Terry Moore (actress) (born 1929), American film actress
 Terry M. McGovern (born 1961), American activist
 Terry McMillan (born 1951), American novelist
 Terry Meza (born 1949), American politician
 Terry Neese, American political figure
 Terry O'Flaherty, Irish mayor
 Terry a. O'Neal (born 1973), American writer
 Terry Oroszi (born 1966), American author
 Terry Orr-Weaver, American molecular biologist
 Terry Plank (born 1963), American volcanologist
 Terry Pheto (born 1981), South African actress
 Terry Reintke (born 1987), German politician
 Terry Spear, American author
 Terry Underwood (born 1944), Australian author
 Terry Wahls (born 1955), American physician
 Terry Tempest Williams (born 1955), American writer

Fictional characters
 Terry, a character from Aqua Teen Hunger Force
 Terry, a pterodactyl boss character from the video game Banjo Tooie
 Terry Bernadino, a character from Reno 911!
 Terry Bogard, from SNK's Fatal Fury and The King of Fighters video games
 Terry Carmichael, a character in the 1996 John Woo film Broken Arrow
 Terry Boot, minor character from the Harry Potter series of novels, by J. K. Rowling
 Terry Chaney, main female character in Final Destination
 Terry Collier, fictional character in The Likely Lads sitcoms and film
 Terry "The Toad" Fields, a character in the 1973 American coming-of-age comedy-drama movie American Graffiti
  Terrance "Terry" Hawthorne, a character in the 1985 American adventure comedy film Pee-wee's Big Adventure
 Terry Ives, mother of Eleven in the television series Stranger Things
 Terry Kimple, a character from The Cleveland Show
 Terry Lee, main character of the comic strip Terry and the Pirates
 Terry Malloy, main protagonist of the 1954 crime drama film On the Waterfront
 Terry McCann, from the TV series Minder played by Dennis Waterman
 Terry McScotty, one of the main characters in the anime series Battle B-Daman
 Terry McGinnis, main character in Batman Beyond
 Terry Milkovich, from Shameless
 Terry Silver, a character in the 1989 American martial arts drama film The Karate Kid Part III and sequel series Cobra Kai
 Terry the Tomboy, from AwesomenessTV
 Terry Williams, a character in the British soap opera Hollyoaks
 Scary Terry, from Rick and Morty
 Terry, from the novel Hatchet
 Terry, from the 2013 animated film Monsters University
 Terry, from the 2020 animated film Soul
 Terry Benedict, casino owner, the main antagonist in the Ocean's trilogy''

See also
 Teri (given name)
 Terri
 Terryville (disambiguation)
 Therry

English feminine given names
English-language unisex given names
English masculine given names
English unisex given names
Hypocorisms
Unisex given names